Electrobeach Music Festival (often abbreviated as EMF) is an annual in July electronic dance music festival held at a park in Port-Barcarès, France. Recent lineups include Afrojack, Tara McDonald, Dirty South, Hardwell, Sebastian Ingrosso and Armin Van Buuren. In 2014 there were two stages and a capacity of people. 2013 saw 56,000 people over two days. 2014 saw 80,000 people over two days, there were two stages and a capacity of 40,000 people.

Line up 

2009
David Asko, Da Fresh, Greg Cerrone, Antoine Clamaran, Joachim Garraud.

2010
Ludovic Rambaud, David Tort, David Vendetta, Fedde Le Grand, Laurent Wolf

2011
Dj Luxury, Ron Carroll, Michaël Canitrot, Bob Sinclar

2012
 Beach Stage : Alex De Guirior, Sergi Domene, Serebro, AutoErotique
 Mainstage : Kalvin Berg, Sébastien Benett, Tara McDonald, Example, DJ Wire, Basto, Ferry Corsten, Steve Aoki

Édition 2013
 Friday 19 July : Circoloogik DJs (Juliano Blanco, Doms Owls, John Lorv's, Funknow & James Kentaro), DJ Ralph, Morgan Nagoya, Alex De Guiror et Marsal Ventura, Reepublic, Markus Schulz, Dirty South, Martin Solveig, Sebastian Ingrosso, Afrojack, Hardwell.
 Saturday 20 July : Circoloogik DJs (Juliano Blanco, Doms Owls, John Lorv's, Funknow & James Kentaro), Jay Style, Sergi Domene, DJ Smash, Nervo, Dizzee Rascal, David Guetta, Nicky Romero.

2014
 Friday 11 July : 
Mainstage : Adrien Toma & DJ Neil, Alex De Guiror & Marsal Ventura, DubVision, DJ Antoine, Krewella, Hard Rock Sofa, R3hab, DJ Snake, W&W, Calvin Harris, Armin van Buuren.
Beach stage : Will Buck, Adam Trigger, Jordi Veliz, D.O.N.S, DJ Ralph, Quentin Mosimann. 
 Saturday 12 July :
Mainstage : Mico C, Sergi Domene, Lets Be Friends, Julian Jordan, Cerrone, Sultan & Ned Shepard, Sebastien Benett, DJ Smash, Example, Fatboy Slim, Sander Van Doorn, Tinie Tempah, Axwell.
EMF Talent : Sylvain Bullier, Freakshow, Marcan, Ocio, Doms Owls, Souzo, Kikker Ft. Manu Dibango, Juli, John Lorvs.
2015
 Friday 10 July : 
Mainstage : Mico C, Jordi Veliz, Lucas & Steve, Matisse & Sadko, Cazette, Otto Knows, Nervo, Madeon, Kaskade, Dimitri Vegas & Like Mike, Avicii
 Saturday 11 July :
Mainstage : Adrien Toma, Alex de Guiror & Marsal Ventura, Arias, Syn Cole, Galantis, Firebeatz, Arty, Don Diablo, Martin Solveig, Alesso, Steve Angello
Sunday 12 July :
Mainstage : Sergi Domene, Maria Helena, Dzeko & Torres, DJ Fresh, Dirty South, Smash, Erick Morillo, Tiësto, Zedd, Axwell Λ Ingrosso, Armin Van Buuren

2016
Thursday 14 July:
Michael Calfan, Tiësto, Michael Canitrot, Eric Prydz, Martin Garrix, Martin Solveig, Arno Cost, Throttle, Luciano & Friends, KIKKR
Friday 15 July:
Robin Schulz, Axwell Λ Ingrosso, EDX, Ruby Rose, Mosimann, Sunnery James & Ryan Marciano, Norman Doray, Tony Romera, Klosman
Saturday 16 July:
Hardwell, Smash, DJ Snake, Dillon Francis, Nicky Romero, Pep & Rash, Swanky Tunes
Also:
Luciano, Sven Väth, César Merveille, DOP, Ilario Alicante, Markus Fix, DJ Ralph, Adrien Toma, Jordi Veliz, Mico C, Maeva Carter, Marsal Ventura, Philippe B, Sergi Domene
Added on 30 March 2016, more acts yet to be announced

Gallery

See also

List of electronic music festivals
Live electronic music

References

External links
Electrobeach.com

Music festivals established in 2009
Electronic music festivals in France